Eric Alexander Ozario is an Konkani music composer and cultural activist, and the founder of Mandd Sobhann, a leading Konkani cultural organization. He also founded Kalaangann, a Konkani heritage centre. Ozario was instrumental in Konkani being approved as an optional language in school education in the state of Karnataka. He has also been the secretary general of the Jagotik Konknni Songhotton (JKS – Global Konkani Organisation) for many years.

In 2009 Ozario participated in a movement to protest a plan to cut trees in Mangalore. Ozario's biography, 'The Indefatigable Crusader' was released in 2014.

Awards

 In  1994 Ozario was bestowed the title 'Konkani Kala Samrat'.

 Konkani Ratna
 State Rajyotsava Prashasti
 Ozario was conferred a lifetime achievement award by Konkani Natak Sabha (KNS) in Mangalore in 2023.

References

Further reading

External links
 Mandd Sobhann - The Birth

People from Karnataka